Andrew Kishore Kumar Baroi (widely known as Andrew Kishore, 4 November 1955 – 6 July 2020) was a Bangladeshi playback singer. He is considered as the "Playback King" of Bangladesh music industry who sang more than 15 thousands songs. He sang for more than 100 Bangladeshi films.

Remembered for his iconic tracks, including "Jiboner Golpo, Achhe Baki Olpo", "Amar Buker Moddhe Khane", "Daak Diyachhen Doyal Amare", "Hayre Manush Rongin Fanush", "Amar Shara Deho Kheyo Go Mati", "Amar Babar Mukhe Prothom Jedin Shunechilam Gaan", "Bhengeche Pinjor Meleche Dana", "Bhalobese Gelam Shudhu", and "Shobai To Bhalobasha Chae". Kishore's great adventure in Dhallywood began with the film Mail Train (1977). "Ochinpurer Rajkumari Nei Je Tar Keu", composed by Saley Alam Khan, was his debut playback song. After receiving critical recognition for the song "Ek Chor Jay Chole", penned by Alam Khan in 'Protigga' (1979), Kishore never had to look back on his great musical career.

For his tremendous contribution to the film industry of the country, Kishore won Bangladesh National Film Award for Best Male Playback Singer a record eight times for his performance in the films Boro Bhalo Lok Chhilo (1982), Surrender (1987), Khotipuron (1989), Padma Meghna Jamuna (1991), Kabul (1996), Aaj Gaye Holud (2000), Saajghor (2007), and Ki Jadu Korila (2008), alongside five prestigious Bachsas Awards and three Meril-Prothom Alo Awards, to name a few. .

Kishore bagged the prestigious Bachsas Awards five times under the category of 'Best Male Playback Singer for films Princes Tina Khan (1984), Shami Stri (1987), Premer Taj Mahal (2001), Mone Prane Acho Tumi (2008), and Golapi Ekhon Bilate (2010)'. Moreover, his golden career was embellished by Meril Prothom Alo Award for three consecutive years (1998-2000) under the Best Singer Male category. Furthermore, in 2012, he won Ifad Film Club Award in the category of Best Playback Singer (Male). His versatile and melodious voice gave life to Bengali movie songs for several decades. Apart from being a prolific singer with a versatile and deeply melodic voice, Kishore also tried to inspire a new generation of singers through platforms like 'Bangladeshi Idol' as one of its judges.

The eminent singer died on July 6, 2020, due to Non-Hodgkin lymphoma.

Early life and career
At the age of six Andrew Kishore started acquiring formal singing training from late Ustad Abdul Aziz Bachchu, the then chief music director of Rajshahi Betar. He was a student of Ustad Abdul Aziz Bachchu's 'Surbani Music School' in Rajshahi. In 1962, he was listed on Rajshahi Betar as a child artist. And then the famous lyricist Mohammad Rafiquzzaman used to watch the children's section as the producer of Rajshahi Betar.

Kishore has contributed to the national movement in his early life. During the 1969 Mass uprising in East Pakistan, he and other contemporary artists used to visit different places of Rajshahi city and sing protest songs. During the Bangladesh Liberation War, Kishore took refuge in India with his family. He used to inspire the freedom fighters by singing in the refugee camps. After the war ended, he was enlisted in the radio in Nazrul, Tagore, modern, folk and patriotic songs categories.

In academic life, Andrew Kishore did a Bachelor of Commerce from Rajshahi Government City College & Master of Commerce in Management from University of Rajshahi in 1977.

After completing his studies, he concentrated on business by owning a grocery store in Rajshahi. However, in 1977, he moved to the house of his childhood friend living in Dhaka. In the same year, he participated in a talent hunt project initiated by Shahidul Islam, the then director of Transcription Service of Bangladesh Betar. On the programme, he rendered the song "Soheli O Soheli", composed by Debu Bhattacherjee and he was able to catch the attention of well known music directors.

Kishore debuted in playback singing in the film Mail Train (1977) where he sang "Ochinpurer Rajkumari Nei Je Tar Keu", composed by Alam Khan. Introduced by A.H.M. Rafique, Kishore made his breakthrough with the song "Ek Chor Jay Choley" from the film Protikkha, composed by Alam Khan.

In 1987, Kishore established an advertising agency called Probaho Media, for TV dramas, commercials and other productions. Later in memory of his late teacher, in 2011, he also established a cultural organisation "Ustad Abdul Aziz Bachchu Sriti Shongshod" in Rajshahi.

Andrew Kishore had dominated the Bangla film industry over the last 40 to 42 years. He also earned acclaim for Hindi and Urdu playbacks. He is the only Bangladeshi artist to sing to the tune of R. D. Burman in an Indo-Bangladeshi venture film Shatru (1986). He has also sung in Urdu film Ranjish (1993) to the tune of Robin Ghosh.

TV and stage appearance
Andrew Kishore sang on Bangladesh Television in the pre-1985 years of his career. But for more than a decade, he played behind the scenes in numerous Bengali film playbacks, but did not appear on the TV screen. After a long 15 years, this talented artist came back to the TV screen in 1999 with the song "Poddo Patar Pani". Since then, he had been a regular artist at Ityadi aired on Bangladesh Television.

He has also been a judge on a music reality show. He was a regular judge of Bangladeshi Idol, a reality television song contest aired on SA TV in 2013.

In addition, he has been seen singing or giving interviews at various times on various channels whose videos exist on YouTube. In the Wind of Change (Bangladeshi TV program) aired on Gaan Bangla music channel, Kishore sang his famous "Haire Manush Rongin Fanush" and "Beder Meye Josna Amay Kotha Diyeche" in a re-composition by music director Kaushik Hossain Taposh, which was once again widely acclaimed by the new generation of listeners.

He has also did numerous concerts at different times in the country and abroad. Andrew Kishore's last musical TV show was "Koto Rongo Jano Re Manush" aired on Channel i.

Personal life
Andrew Kishore was born on November 4, 1955, in Rajshahi, Bangladesh. He was born in a Bengali Christian family to parents Khitish Chandra Baroi and Minu Baroi. Andrew's father was from Kotalipara Upazila and worked in Rajshahi. He was involved in the medical profession in Rajshahi and Andrew was born and raised in there. Andrew's mother Minu Baroi was a teacher at Bolanpur Mission Girl's High School, Rajshahi and was a music devoted person. Her favorite singer was Kishore Kumar. That is why Andrew named Andrew Kishore Kumar Baroi. She wanted her son to name one day like Kishore Kumar. He started his first lesson in music with Ustad Abdul Aziz Bachchu of Rajshahi at the behest of his mother. Since a young age, Kishore had a passion for media which lead him to stardom eventually.

Kishore married Lipika Andrew (Eti) in 1988. They have a daughter, Minim Andrew (Songa), and a son, Jay Andrew (Saptok). Kishore has two siblings, Shikha Biswas and Swapon Baroi. He was the youngest among them.

Interview

Death
Kishore was diagnosed with Diffuse large B-cell lymphoma on 9 September 2019. He also had kidney- and hormone-related diseases. His chemotherapy treatment started under Prof Dr. Lim Soon Thye at the Singapore General Hospital. He returned to Bangladesh on 11 June 2020. He had been shifted to the Intensive Care Unit of a clinic adjacent to his sister's house and run by his sister after his physical condition had significantly deteriorated.
He died on 6 July. Andrew's brother-in-law Dr Patrick Bipul Biswas confirmed the news to the press.
His coffin was later brought from City Church to the Christian Cemetery of the Church of Bangladesh in Srirampur area of Rajshahi city on 15 July 2020 at 11am. He was buried at 11:30 pm. He was buried in front of the cemetery. This cemetery contains the graves of his parents.

List of background music in the movie

List of some of his popular Bengali songs

List of songs in other languages

Single tracks

Filmography

Discography

Songs for television

Non-film songs

Awards and nominations

Notes

References

External links

The story of the Playback King (in Bengali) on Bangla Movie Database (BMDb). Archived from the original on July 30, 2020.
Andrew Kishore Discography on "Sur O Dhoni" author Sur O Dhoni. Archived from the original on July 30, 2020.
Andrew Kishore discography on Deezer
Andrew Kishore discography on Napster
Andrew Kishore discography on KKBox

1955 births
2020 deaths
People from Rajshahi District
Bangladeshi playback singers
21st-century Bangladeshi male singers
21st-century Bangladeshi singers
Best Male Playback Singer National Film Award (Bangladesh) winners
Deaths from non-Hodgkin lymphoma
Deaths from cancer in Bangladesh
Best Male Singer Meril-Prothom Alo Award winners
20th-century Bangladeshi male singers
20th-century Bangladeshi singers